Dungannon is an unincorporated community in Noble County, Ohio, United States.

History
Dungannon was laid out in 1856. The post office once located at Dungannon was called Ridge. This post office operated from 1867 until 1904.

References

Unincorporated communities in Noble County, Ohio
Unincorporated communities in Ohio